San Carlos Airport  is a public use airport located  west-southwest of San Carlos, Mendoza, Argentina. Its runway is not marked.

See also

Transport in Argentina
List of airports in Argentina

References

External links 
OpenStreetMap - Eugenio Bustos depot

Airports in Argentina
Mendoza Province